"Se på mig" (literally translating into "Look at Me"; an English version is titled "Another Night") is a song by Swedish singer Jan Johansen. It represented  at the Eurovision Song Contest 1995 in Dublin, Ireland, using the colloquial spelling "Se på mej".

It was the 18th song that was performed on the night, following ' Alexandros Panayi with "Sti Fotia" and preceding 's Aud Wilken with "Fra Mols til Skagen". At the close of the voting, it had received 100 points, ultimately finishing 3rd out of a possible 23. It was succeeded as Swedish representative at the 1996 contest by One More Time with "Den vilda".

The song peaked on the Swedish Sverigetopplistan singles chart at #1 twice. On 21 April 1995 it reached No. 1 on the charts, staying there for five weeks and then returned to #1 on 9 June 1995 for another four weeks.

Critical reception
Pan-European magazine Music & Media wrote, "The number 3 at the Eurovision Song Contest in Dublin proves to be a man of endurance, as radio is steadily picking up his AOR ballad, which has a synth line a la Brucie's Philadelphia."

Charts

Weekly charts

Year-end charts

References

1995 songs
Eurovision songs of 1995
Eurovision songs of Sweden
Melodifestivalen songs of 1995
Number-one singles in Sweden
Songs written by Bobby Ljunggren
Songs with lyrics by Ingela Forsman
Jan Johansen (singer) songs